Events from the year 1195 in Ireland.

Incumbent
Lord: John

Events
 Kilkenny Castle built by William Marshal, to control a fording-point of the River Nore and the junction of several routeways.

Births

Deaths